Angus Alexander Patrick Atkinson (born 19 January 1998) is an English cricketer. He made his first-class debut on 8 August 2020, for Surrey in the 2020 Bob Willis Trophy. He made his Twenty20 debut on 28 August 2020, for Surrey in the 2020 t20 Blast. He made his List A debut on 22 July 2021, for Surrey in the 2021 Royal London One-Day Cup.

References

External links
 

1998 births
Living people
English cricketers
Surrey cricketers
Cricketers from Chelsea, London